The Dearborn River is a tributary of the Missouri River, approximately 70 mi (113 km) long, in central Montana in the United States. It rises in the Lewis and Clark National Forest, near Scapegoat Mountain in the Lewis and Clark Range of the Rocky Mountains at the continental divide, in western Lewis and Clark County. It flows generally southeast through secluded canyons, and joins the Missouri near Craig.

It is crossed by the Dearborn River High Bridge, which was constructed in 1897.

It is a popular destination for whitewater rafting and fly fishing. Whirling disease has become  a significant problem among trout in the river.

The Dearborn is a Class I river for stream access for recreational purposes from the highway 431 bridge to its confluence with the Missouri river.

See also

List of rivers of Montana
Montana Stream Access Law

Notes

Rivers of Montana
Tributaries of the Missouri River
Rivers of Cascade County, Montana
Rivers of Lewis and Clark County, Montana